Events from the year 1992 in Burkina Faso

Incumbents
President: Blaise Compaoré
Prime Minister: Youssouf Ouédraogo (from 16 June)

Events

May
24 May – Burkinabe parliamentary election, 1992

Births
2 December: Jonathan Sundy Zongo, footballer

Deaths

References

 
Burkina Faso
Years of the 20th century in Burkina Faso
1990s in Burkina Faso
Burkina Faso